Founded in 1857, the Maryland Club is one of the oldest private clubs in the United States that was founded as an exclusive men's club. Its large Romanesque clubhouse, dating to 1891, is located in Baltimore’s historic Mount Vernon neighborhood, where it has always had its home.

The Club’s members have traditionally numbered among the region’s most prominent business, professional, civic and nonprofit leaders. Though membership is by invitation only, the Club says it wants a diverse membership of outstanding individuals regardless of race, gender, religion, ethnicity or sexual orientation.

In 1861, the club supported the secession of the Confederate States of America. The club was closed by Union troops during the American Civil War and General Lew Wallace outraged local residents by turning the club building into a shelter for homeless former slaves.  The club re-opened after the war. The club opposed Prohibition and flouted the law through the use of private lockers. After a 1995 fire nearly destroyed its building, the club restored its architectural and aesthetic elements. In 2019, a major renovation added squash facilities, improved the exercise area, added a bistro-style restaurant, and made other system upgrades.

In 1988, the club began accepting Jews as members.

Notable members
Jérôme Napoléon Bonaparte, the first president of the club 
William Cabell Bruce
Charles W. Field
Charles F. Mayer
Charles F. Mayer (railroad president), nephew of the above
45th Governor of the State of Maryland, Edwin Warfield
James T. Woodward
Glenn L. Martin

See also
Knickerbocker Club
Metropolitan Club
Union Club of the City of New York

References

Gentlemen's clubs in the United States
1857 establishments in Maryland